The Australian Under-21 Speedway Championship is a motorcycle speedway championship held each year since 1986, with the exception of 1994 and 1995, to determine the Australian Under-21 national champion. The event is organised by Motorcycling Australia (MA).

History
The event was run as the Australian Under-18 Championship in 1986. This lasted just one year and was changed to the Under-21 Championship in 1987 to bring it in line with the Individual Speedway Junior World Championship which is also for Under-21s.

The inaugural Under-21 Championship in 1987 was held at the Undera Park Speedway in Victoria. Queensland riders scored a trifecta. The championship was won by Gary Allan from brothers Steve and Tony Langdon. It would take another 22 years (2009) before another Queenslander would step on the podium when Darcy Ward won the first of three straight titles. Victorian Nigel Tremelling won the single Under-18 Championship in 1986.

Leigh Adams from Mildura, Sydney's Chris Holder and Victorian rider Max Fricke, jointly hold the record for most wins in the Australian Under-21 Championship with four wins each. Adams would win the 1992 Under-21 World Championship as well as winning a record 10 senior Australian Championships while in 1992 he became the first reigning Australian U/21 Champion to win the senior title. Holder won the 2012 World Championship. Triple Australian Under-21 Champion Darcy Ward won the Under-21 World Championship in 2009 and 2010 while finishing second in 2011 while Max Fricke won the Under-21 World Championship in 2016 after finishing 6th in the 2015 U/21 World Championship.

Leigh Adams, Darcy Ward and Max Fricke are the only Australian Under-21 Champions to have won the Under-21 World Championship.

No rider from Western Australia, Tasmania, the Northern Territory or the Australian Capital Territory has won the championship, though 2003 and 2004 winner Rory Schlein from South Australia was born in Darwin (NT).

Max Fricke from Victoria won the (2017) Australian Under-21 Championship. Fricke won his record equaling fourth title at the Loxford Park Speedway in Kurri Kurri on 28 January. Jaimon Lidsey from Victoria won the title he won in 2018, 2019 and 2020.

Past Winners

<small>* 1986 run as the Australian Under-18 Championship.** 2008 No third place awarded. Troy Batchelor fell & was excluded on lap 2, Robert Ksiezak suffered engine failure in lap 2 of the re-run Final leaving Chris Holder and Tyron Proctor as the only finishers</small>

Medals classification
(2 or more)

See also
 Sport in Australia

References

Books

Articles
Oakes, Peter (2013) "New Champ Keeps Cool", Speedway Star'', 26 January 2013, pp. 6–7

External links
Australian Under-21 Solo Title's
Motorcycle Australia results since 2003

Australia
Under-21
Under-21

pl:Indywidualne mistrzostwa Australii na żużlu